This is a list of buildings that are examples of the Art Deco architectural style in Virginia, United States.

Alexandria 
 Arlandria Floors Building, Garage, Del Ray, Alexandria, 1941
 Bowman's Drugstore, Del Ray, Alexandria, 1941
 Chesapeake & Potomac Telephone Co. of Virginia Building, Del Ray, Alexandria, 1940 and 1947
 Del Ray Building, Del Ray, Alexandria, 1938
 George Washington Middle School, Del Ray, Alexandria, 1936
 Glendale Garden Apartments, Del Ray, Alexandria, 1937
 Leslie Avenue/Monroe Avenue Warehouses ( now Swing Coffee), Del Ray, Alexandria, 1952
 Palm Theatre and Guild Theatre, Del Ray, Alexandria, 1923, 1955
 Poladian Building, Del Ray, Alexandria, 1939, 1947
 Torpedo Factory Art Center, Old Town, Alexandria, 1918 and 1930s
 Walgreens Building, Del Ray, Alexandria, 1941

Arlington County 
 Arlington Cinema 'N' Drafthouse, Arlington Country, 1939
 Calvert Manor, Arlington Country, 1948
 Cherrydale Auto Parts (former Progressive Cleaners), Arlington Country, 1939
 Glebe Center, Arlington Country, 1940
 Lee Garden Apartments, Arlington Country
 Wakefield Manor, Arlington Country, 1943
 Washington-Liberty High School addition, Arlington Country, 1938

Blacksburg 
 Blacksburg Motor Company, Inc., Blacksburg, 1923 and 1933
 Lyric Theatre, Blacksburg, 1930
 National Bank of Blacksburg, Blacksburg, 1941

Lynchburg 
 Allied Arts Building, Lynchburg, 1931
 Armstrong Elementary School, Lynchburg, 1954
 Lynchburg News & Daily Advance Building, Lynchburg, 1931
 Pyramid Motors, Lynchburg, 1937

Norfolk 
 Ocean View Elementary School, Norfolk, 1939
 Walter E. Hoffman United States Courthouse, Norfolk, 1932
 York Center, Norfolk, 1924

Portsmouth 
 Commodore Theatre, Portsmouth, 1945
 Governor Dinwiddie Hotel and Suites, Portsmouth, 1945
 National Guard Armory, Portsmouth, 1936

Richmond 
 208 East Grace Street, Richmond, 1930
 3500 Center, Richmond, 1956
 718 East Franklin Street, Richmond, 1951
 Altamont Apartments, Richmond, 1929
 Cary Street Park and Shop Center, Richmond, 1938
 Central National Bank Richmond, 1929
 Hand Craft Services, Richmond, 1946
 The Hippodrome, Richmond, 1946
 Lewis F. Powell Jr. United States Courthouse and Annex (former Parcel Post Building), Richmond, 1929
 Model Office Park, Richmond, 1939
 Model Tobacco Building, Richmond, 1940
 Nolde Brothers Bakery, Richmond, 1926
 Richmond Storage and Service Garage, 1928
 Syndlor and Hundley Building, Richmond, 1931
 Thomas Jefferson High School, Richmond, 1929
 Lewis F. Powell, Junior United States Courthouse Annex, Richmond, 1929
 Verizon Building, Richmond, 1929
 Verizon Building Annex, Richmond, 1949
 West Hospital, Richmond, 1940

Roanoke 
 425 Campbell Avenue, Roanoke, 1934
 1306 Grandin Road, Roanoke, 1926
 Appalachian Electric Power Building, Roanoke, 1947
 Claytor Memorial Clinic, Roanoke, 1947
 Community Inn, Roanoke, 1929
 The Cornerstone, Roanoke, 1923
 General Office Building-North, Roanoke, 1931
 Gran Piano, N.W. Pugh & Company Department Store, Roanoke, 1930
 Mick-or-Mack Grocery, Roanoke, 1953
 Norfolk & Southern Railroad Office, Roanoke
 Ponce De Leon Hotel, Roanoke, 1931
 Professional Arts Building, Roanoke, 1929
 Roanoke Apartments, Roanoke, 1950
 Roanoke Passenger Station, Roanoke, 1949
 Roanoke Higher Education Center, Roanoke, 1931
 Television Center, Roanoke, 1955
 Walker Condos, Roanoke, 1937

Other cities 
 29 Diner, Fairfax, 1947
 Ashland Theatre Ashland, 1948
 Beacon Theatre, Hopewell, 1928
 Carl's Ice Cream, Fredericksburg, 1947
 Central High School, Painter, 1932
 Charlottesville Coca-Cola Bottling Works, Charlottesville, 1939
 Donk's Theatre, Hudgins, 1947
 Emporia Armory, Emporia, 1936
 Executive Plaza, Bristol, 1925
 Frost Diner, Warrenton, 1946
 Hampton City Hall, Hampton, 1939
 Henrico Theatre, Highland Springs, 1938
 Hotel Warwick, Newport News, 1928
 Island Roxy, Chincoteague, 1945
 Lincoln Theatre, Marion, 1929
 New Hope High School, New Hope, 1925
 Palace Theatre, Cape Charles, 1941
 Pitts Theatre, Culpepper, 1937
 Randolph Hotel, Hopewell, 1927
 Royal Clipper Inn & Suites, Virginia Beach, 1980
 Shenandoah Motel, Front Royal, 1950
 StellarOne Bank Building, Rocky Mount, 1928
 Visulite Theatre, Staunton, 1937
 Walker–Grant School, Fredericksburg, 1938
 Whittaker Memorial Hospital, Newport News, 1943
 Winchester Coca-Cola Bottling Works, Winchester, 1941

See also 
 List of Art Deco architecture
 List of Art Deco architecture in the United States

References 

 "Art Deco & Streamline Moderne Buildings." Roadside Architecture.com. Retrieved 2019-01-03.
 Cinema Treasures. Retrieved 2022-09-06
 "Court House Lover". Flickr. Retrieved 2022-09-06
 "New Deal Map". The Living New Deal. Retrieved 2020-12-25.
 "SAH Archipedia". Society of Architectural Historians. Retrieved 2021-11-21.

External links 
 

 
Art Deco
Art Deco architecture in Virginia
Virginia-related lists